Burguete (Castilian) or Auritz (Basque) is a town and municipality located in the province and autonomous community of Navarre, northern Spain.

Ernest Hemingway lodged in Burguete in 1924 and 1925 for a fishing trip to the Irati river, and describes it in his novel The Sun Also Rises.

References

External links
 AURITZ / BURGUETE in the Bernardo Estornés Lasa - Auñamendi Encyclopedia (Euskomedia Fundazioa) 

Municipalities in Navarre